František Procházka (25 January 1962 – 27 April 2012) was a Czech ice hockey defenseman who played on the 1992 bronze medal-winning Olympic ice hockey team for Czechoslovakia.

Career
Procházka began his career with TJ CHZ Litvínov and played for the team from 1980 to 1990. He then moved to Finland's SM-liiga with Jokerit for one season before joining EHC Freiburg of the Eishockey-Bundesliga in Germany.

In 1993, Procházka joined HC Milano Devils of Serie A won the Serie A championship with the team that season. He returned to Germany in 1995, signing for ESG Füchse Sachsen of the Deutsche Eishockey Liga before moving to the United Kingdom the following year, playing for the Ayr Scottish Eagles of the Ice Hockey Superleague.

In 1997, Procházka returned to Litvínov for one season before finishing his career in Germany's third-tier league the Oberliga, with single-season spells at ERC Haßfurt and ESC Dresden.

Procházka was also a member of the Czechoslovakia national team, playing in four Ice Hockey World Championships as well as the 1992 Winter Olympics where he won a bronze medal.

Following his playing career, he worked as a coach of the Czech 1.liga team HC Teplice for some time. Procházka died on 27 April 2012 at aged 50 following a long illness.

Career statistics

Regular season and playoffs

International

References

External links

1962 births
2012 deaths
Ice hockey people from Brno
Ayr Scottish Eagles players
Czech ice hockey defencemen
Czech ice hockey coaches
Czechoslovak ice hockey defencemen
EHC Freiburg players
Lausitzer Füchse players
HC Litvínov players
Ice hockey players at the 1992 Winter Olympics
Jokerit players
Olympic bronze medalists for Czechoslovakia
Olympic ice hockey players of Czechoslovakia
Olympic medalists in ice hockey
Medalists at the 1992 Winter Olympics
Czech expatriate sportspeople in Scotland
Expatriate ice hockey players in Scotland
Czech expatriate ice hockey players in Finland
Czech expatriate ice hockey players in Germany
Czech expatriate sportspeople in Italy
Expatriate ice hockey players in Italy